Flintoft is a surname. Notable people with the surname include:

Joseph Flintoft Berry (1856–1931), Canadian Bishop
Luke Flintoft (1680–1727), English composer
William Flintoft (1890–1951), Australian rules football player

See also
Flintoff